Carex condensata is a tussock-forming species of perennial sedge in the family Cyperaceae. It is native to parts of Asia, from the eastern Himalayas in the north west to Thailand in the south east.

See also
List of Carex species

References

condensata
Plants described in 1834
Taxa named by Christian Gottfried Daniel Nees von Esenbeck
Flora of Thailand